Langloisia setosissima, the bristly langloisia, bristly-calico, Great Basin langloisia or lilac sunbonnets, is a flowering plant, the sole species in the genus Langloisia in the family Polemoniaceae.

The genus name of Langloisia is in honour of Auguste Berthélemy Langlois (1832–1900), who was a French-born American clergyman and botanist.

It is an annual plant, growing to 4–20 cm tall. The leaves are spirally arranged, linear, 2–3 cm long, densely bristly and with a toothed margin. The flowers are white to light blue or pale purple in color, 1.5–2 cm diameter, with a deeply five-lobed corolla.

There are two subspecies:
Langloisia setosissima subsp. setosissima. Flowers with a uniformly colored corolla, possibly showing faint patterns of dots and stripes.
Langloisia setosissima subsp. punctata (syn. Langloisia lanata, Langloisia punctata). Flowers with a corolla spotted with darker purple and yellow.

The genus Loeseliastrum was previously included in Langloisia, formed from two former Langloisia species:
 Loeseliastrum matthewsii, formerly Langloisia matthewsii
 Loeseliastrum schottii, formerly Langloisia schottii

References

Other sources
 Jepson Flora Project: Langloisia setosissima
 CalFlora: Langloisia setosissima (requires login)
 Photos of subsp. setosissima and subsp. punctata
 USDA Plants Profile
 Mojave Desert Wildflowers, Jon Mark Stewart, 1998, pg. 147

Polemoniaceae
Monotypic Ericales genera
North American desert flora
Flora of the Southwestern United States
Flora of Idaho
Flora of Oregon
Flora of Northeastern Mexico
Polemoniaceae genera